In mathematics, Descartes' rule of signs, first described by René Descartes in his work La Géométrie, is a technique for getting information on the number of positive real roots of a polynomial. It asserts that the number of positive roots is at most the number of sign changes in the sequence of polynomial's coefficients (omitting the zero coefficients), and that the difference between these two numbers is always even. This implies, in particular, that if the number of sign changes is zero or one, then there are exactly zero or one positive roots, respectively.

By a homographic transformation of the variable, one may use Descartes' rule of signs for getting a similar information on the number of roots in any interval. This is the basic idea of Budan's theorem and Budan–Fourier theorem. By repeating the division of an interval into two intervals, one gets eventually a list of disjoint intervals containing together all real roots of the polynomial, and containing each exactly one real root. Descartes rule of signs and homographic transformations of the variable are, nowadays, the basis of the fastest algorithms for computer computation of real roots of polynomials (see real-root isolation).

Descartes himself used the transformation  for using his rule for getting information of the number of negative roots.

Descartes' rule of signs

Positive roots
The rule states that if the nonzero terms of a single-variable polynomial with real coefficients are ordered by descending variable exponent, then the number of positive roots of the polynomial is either equal to the number of sign changes between consecutive (nonzero) coefficients, or is less than it by an even number. A root of multiplicity  is counted as  roots.

In particular, if the number of sign changes is zero or one, the number of positive roots equals the number of sign changes.

Negative roots
As a corollary of the rule, the number of negative roots is the number of sign changes after multiplying the coefficients of odd-power terms by −1, or fewer than it by an even number. This procedure is equivalent to substituting the negation of the variable for the variable itself.
 
Thus, applying Descartes' rule of signs to this polynomial gives the maximum number of negative roots of the original polynomial.

Example: real roots
The polynomial

Therefore, it has exactly one positive root.
To find the number of negative roots, change the signs of the coefficients of the terms with odd exponents, i.e., apply Descartes' rule of signs to the polynomial , to obtain the polynomial

In fact, the factorization of the first polynomial is
	

	 		
so the roots are –1 (twice) and +1 (once).

The factorization of the second polynomial is

So here, the roots are +1 (twice) and –1 (once), the negation of the roots of the original polynomial.

Nonreal roots
Any nth degree polynomial has exactly n  roots in the complex plane, if counted according to multiplicity. So if f(x) is a polynomial with real coefficients which does not have a root at 0 (that is a polynomial with a nonzero constant term) then the minimum number of nonreal roots is equal to

where p denotes the maximum number of positive roots, q denotes the maximum number of negative roots (both of which can be found using Descartes' rule of signs), and n denotes the degree of the equation.

Example: some zero coefficients and nonreal roots
The polynomial

has one sign change; so the maximum number of positive real roots is one. As

has no sign change, the original polynomial has no negative real roots. So the minimum number of nonreal roots is

Since nonreal roots of a polynomial with real coefficients must occur in conjugate pairs, it means that  has exactly two nonreal roots and one real root, which is positive.

Special case
The subtraction of only multiples of 2 from the maximal number of positive roots occurs because the polynomial may have nonreal roots, which always come in pairs since the rule applies to polynomials whose coefficients are real. Thus if the polynomial is known to have all real roots, this rule allows one to find the exact number of positive and negative roots. Since it is easy to determine the multiplicity of zero as a root, the sign of all roots can be determined in this case.

Generalizations
If the real polynomial P has k real positive roots counted with multiplicity, then for every a > 0 there are at least k changes of sign in the sequence of coefficients of the Taylor series of the function eaxP(x). For sufficiently large a, there are exactly k such changes of sign.

In the 1970s Askold Khovanskii developed the theory of fewnomials that generalises Descartes' rule. The rule of signs can be thought of as stating that the number of real roots of a polynomial is dependent on the polynomial's complexity, and that this complexity is proportional to the number of monomials it has, not its degree. Khovanskiǐ showed that this holds true not just for polynomials but for algebraic combinations of many transcendental functions, the so-called Pfaffian functions.

See also

Notes

External links

Descartes' Rule of Signs – Proof of the rule
Descartes' Rule of Signs – Basic explanation

Theorems about polynomials